Acadieville is a civil parish in Kent County, New Brunswick, Canada.

For governance purposes it is almost entirely within the village of Nouvelle-Arcadie, with a small area on the eastern boundary part of the Kent rural district, both of which are members of the Kent Regional Service Commission.

Prior to the 2023 governance reform, the parish was divided between the village of Rogersville and the local service district of the parish of Acadieville, which included an area with reduced services named Acadie Siding.

Origin of name
William F. Ganong considered the name's origin to be obviously from Acadie.

History
Acadieville was erected in 1876 from Carleton Parish.

Acadieville Parish was first settled in 1868 by Acadian settlers who rushed to claim the provincial Crown Lands after it was revealed that the surveyed route for the Intercolonial Railway would pass through the area. 

In 1869, the Intercolonial Railway's route was modified and it was constructed approximately 10 kilometres to the west.

Boundaries
Acadieville Parish is bounded:

on the northwest by the Northumberland County line;
on the east by the eastern line of a grant in Saint-Luc prolonged southerly to the Saint-Louis Parish line and northerly to the Northumberland County line;
on the southeast by a line running south 75º 30' west from the corner of a grant west of Route 11 near Saint-Théodule in Saint-Louis Parish to the northern line of Weldford Parish, at a point about 3.25 kilometres west of Route 126;
on the south by the northern line of Weldford Parish, which is a line due west from the northernmost corner of the Richibucto 15 Indian reserve;
on the west by a line running north 22º west, based on the magnet of 1867, from a point on the Westmorland County line twenty miles (32.2 kilometres) west of the northern tip of Shediac Island.

Communities
Communities at least partly within the parish; bold indicates a municipality

Acadie Siding
Acadieville
Barrieau
Block 14
Centre-Acadie
Noinville
Pineau
Richard-Village
Rogersville
Saint-Athanase
Saint-Luc
Vautour
Village-Saint-Jean
Village-Saint-Pierre

Bodies of water
Bodies of water at least partly in the parish:
Barnaby River
Bay du Vin River
Kouchibouguac River

Demographics
Population totals do not include the village of Rogersville. Revised census figures based on the 2023 local governance reforms have not been released.

Population
Population trend

Language
Mother tongue (2016)

See also
List of parishes in New Brunswick

Notes

References

External links
Official Website (french)

Parishes of Kent County, New Brunswick
Populated places established in 1868
Local service districts of Kent County, New Brunswick